Spire Motorsports is an American auto racing organization competing in the NASCAR Cup Series. The team is a subsidiary of Spire Sports + Entertainment. In the Cup Series, the team currently fields two Chevrolet Camaro ZL1 teams: the No. 7 for Corey LaJoie and the No. 77 for Ty Dillon. In the Xfinity Series, the team fields the No. 77 Chevrolet Camaro part-time for Carson Hocevar. In the truck series, the team fields the No. 7 Chevrolet Silverado part-time for multiple drivers.

History
On December 4, 2018, Spire Sports + Entertainment announced they purchased their charter from the now-defunct Furniture Row Racing. At the same time, the team announced they will use the No. 77 and field Chevrolet Camaro ZL1s. FRR President Joe Garone joined the team to serve the same position.

The team, in its first year of operation, operated in the same shop as Premium Motorsports as part of an alliance with Premium owner Jay Robinson. However, Premium was sold to Rick Ware Racing in 2020, and the team operated out of the RWR shop until season's end. On August 11, 2020, Spire Motorsports purchased the assets of Leavine Family Racing, allowing them to expand to a two-car operation in 2021. Following the acquisition, the team moved their headquarters from Mooresville to the former shop of AK Racing in Concord, North Carolina. On October 7, it was announced that Spire Motorsports had secured a third charter which would be leased to Trackhouse Racing for the 2021 season. On December 10, it was reported that NASCAR on NBC analyst and former Hendrick Motorsports crew chief Steve Letarte will serve as a consultant for the team.

On June 18, 2021, it was announced that Spire had sold two charters (for the No. 77, and the one leased to Trackhouse Racing) to Kaulig Racing for the 2022 season. In the announcement, Spire's co-owners said, "We will continue to field the No. 7 with Corey LaJoie as a chartered entry in 2022. We remain committed to NASCAR and the Cup Series and we will continue to look for opportunities to grow and compete in the future." In 2022, Spire purchased Rick Ware Racing's No. 53 charter for the No. 77.

On November 23, 2021, Spire announced that they would field a team in the Camping World Truck Series in 2022, with Kevin Manion as Crew Chief and a to-be-determined schedule and driver line-up.

NASCAR Cup Series

Car No. 7 history 
Corey LaJoie (2021–present) 

On November 30, 2020, Spire Motorsports announced that Corey LaJoie signed a multi-year agreement with the team starting in 2021. In addition, the team selected the No. 7 with permission from Tommy Baldwin Racing to pay tribute to Alan Kulwicki and Geoff Bodine.

LaJoie drove the No. 7 to a ninth-place finish at the 2021 Daytona 500. Following the season opener, however, the team was unable to break into the top 20 until the race at COTA, where LaJoie finished 20th. Josh Berry drove the No. 7 at Michigan, as LaJoie was sidelined in accordance with team and COVID-19 protocols. LaJoie finished the season 29th in points.

On March 15, 2022, crew chief Ryan Sparks was suspended for four races due to a tire and wheel loss during the 2022 Ruoff Mortgage 500 at Phoenix. At Atlanta, LaJoie led a career-best 19 laps and was on his way to claiming his first career win with two laps to go when Chase Elliott overtook him and blocked him on the high side, causing him to brush the wall and spin before colliding with Kurt Busch and finishing the race in 21st place.

Car No. 7 results

Car No. 77 history  
Multiple drivers (2019–2022) 

In January 2019, Quin Houff signed with Spire for a part-time schedule in the No. 77 in 2019 starting at ISM Raceway. Spire Motorsports formed a partnership with Chip Ganassi Racing to field the No. 40 for Jamie McMurray at the 2019 Daytona 500 and Advance Auto Parts Clash, using the newly acquired No. 77 charter to effectively renumber it to the No. 40 for a one-off and guarantee it qualified for the race. Prior to Houff's debut, Garrett Smithley and Reed Sorenson drove the car at Atlanta Motor Speedway and Las Vegas Motor Speedway, respectively. Prior to the Atlanta race, car chief Shane Callis was ejected from the track after the No. 77 failed pre-qualifying inspection multiple times. D. J. Kennington joined the team for the Martinsville Speedway race.  In April, NASCAR Xfinity Series regular Justin Haley made his Cup debut with the team at Talladega Superspeedway.

On July 7, the team won their first Cup race in their 18th start at the rain-shortened 2019 Coke Zero Sugar 400 at Daytona, with Haley behind the wheel. Haley and the team were not eligible for the Cup Series Playoffs but did receive the Daytona winner's check.

On September 29, Blake Jones was announced to drive the No. 77 at the October Talladega race. Timmy Hill drove for the team at the Kansas and Martinsville playoff races.

On November 27, the team was docked 50 owner points and listed owner T. J. Puchyr fined $50,000 after being caught in a race manipulation scheme at the Homestead-Miami race: Sorenson was heard ignoring multiple calls to pit late in the race before finally obliging. The team then retired the car with an official reason stated being mechanical issues. Along with Rick Ware Racing also exiting the race, this enabled the No. 27 of Premium Motorsports to secure the highest Open (non-chartered) team in the final point standings.

Spire and Chip Ganassi Racing rekindled their partnership in 2020, fielding the No. 77 for Ross Chastain at the Daytona 500 and Coca-Cola 600.

For the Michigan double-header the No. 77 team was renumbered to the No. 74 with sponsorship from "Fake Steak" as a tie-in promotion with the Netflix sitcom The Crew.

Jamie McMurray was hired to drive in the 2021 Daytona 500, his first NASCAR sanctioned start since the 2019 Daytona 500. He was caught up in a wreck on Lap 14 but managed to recover to finish in an incredible eighth place. Haley drove the car for the majority of the season, with his highest finishes being eighth at Indianapolis and sixth at the Daytona night race.

In 2022, Landon Cassill drove the No. 77 for the majority of the year, while Josh Bilicki drove in the races Cassill was not entered in. Justin Allgaier was announced as the entry for the Bristol dirt race.

Ty Dillon (2023)
On October 17, 2022, Spire Motorsports announced that Ty Dillon would drive the No. 77 full-time in 2023.

Car No. 77 results

Xfinity Series

Car No. 77 history 
On March 7, 2023, the team announced that they will expand their racing operations to the NASCAR Xfinity Series, with Carson Hocevar running six races in their No. 77 car, making his debut in the series.

Car No. 77 results

Craftsman Truck Series

Truck No. 7 History 

On February 11, 2022, Spire announced Austin Hill would drive the No. 7 Chevrolet Silverado in the season opening race at Daytona with Kevin Manion as crew chief and sponsorship from United Rentals. On April 7, William Byron gave Spire its first Truck Series win at Martinsville. On April 12, Chase Elliott was announced as the No. 7 driver for the Bristol dirt race. On May 31, It was announced that Rajah Caruth would make his truck series debut at the World Wide Technology Raceway in the No.  7.

Truck No. 7 results

References

External links
 

2018 establishments in North Carolina
American auto racing teams
Companies based in North Carolina
American companies established in 2018
NASCAR teams